Ø-Færgen is a Danish ferry company that operates a single ferry, M/S Faaborg III, between Faaborg Harbour and the small islands of Avernakø and Lyø in the South Funen Archipelago.

External links
 Official website
 Scedual

Ferry companies of Denmark
Transport in Funen